LNER Class A4 No. 4469 Sir Ralph Wedgwood was an A4 class locomotive of the LNER. Built at Doncaster Works, it was originally named Gadwall, being renamed Sir Ralph Wedgwood in March 1939 in recognition of Wedgwood's sixteen years of service as Chief Officer of the LNER between 1923 and 1939.

Construction and entry to service
No. 4469 was built at the Doncaster Works as builders number 1871 in 1938. It received the name Gadwall, and was allocated to Gateshead shed on completion. It was paired with non-corridor tender No. 5672 built new in 1938; as one of the A4 class locomotives built for general express duties it was painted in garter blue.

In March 1939, No. 4469 was officially renamed Sir Ralph Wedgwood shortly before the retirement of its namesake. This was one of three locomotives to be named after LNER officials in that year, the others being No. 4499 Sir Murrough Wilson (originally Pochard, renamed April 1939) and 4500 Sir Ronald Matthews (formerly Garganey, renamed March 1939). Following the outbreak of World War II, No. 4469 initially retained its garter blue livery before being repainted into wartime black. The valances over the driving wheels were also removed for ease of access to the locomotive's valve gear.

Baedeker Raid
In late April 1942, No. 4469 received repairs at Doncaster Works and was temporarily allocated to Doncaster shed for running in on local services before returning to Gateshead. It was stabled at York North Shed on the night of 28/29 April 1942, the night of the Baedeker raid on York. During the attack, York station and North Shed were bombed; during the attack No. 4469 and another nearby engine, B16 class No. 925 were damaged after a bomb fell through the shed roof and exploded between the two engines.

The locomotive was severely damaged as a result of the explosion, but was recovered and towed to Doncaster shortly afterward. Due to the degree of damage, it was considered impractical to rebuild No. 4469, and the locomotive was condemned and later scrapped. Tender No. 5672, attached to No. 4469 since new in 1938, was stored at Doncaster until 1945, when it was then rebuilt, given the new tender number 703 and attached to LNER Thompson Class A2/1 No. 3696 Highland Chieftain. The chime whistle was also removed and fitted to Y8 class 0-4-0T No. 560 as a trial.

Replacement and commemoration
Following the scrapping of No. 4469, one of its damaged nameplates was rescued from scrap by a member of the Doncaster workshops staff for preservation at his home. It was later sold by his grandson in the early 2000s, with speculation that the National Railway Museum would seek to obtain it; the NRM subsequently were unable to purchase it and it became part of a private collection. A new set of nameplates were made two years later in 1944 and fitted to A4 No. 4466, formerly named Herring Gull, and which carried these plates until withdrawn as British Railways No. 60006 on 3 September 1965 and scrapped on 31 October that year.

A plaque was placed on the spot where No. 4469 was destroyed in 1942, now within the Great Hall of the National Railway Museum, by the Gresley Society on 29 April 1992 to mark the 50th anniversary of the raid.

References

External links
Photo and information
The Gresley A4 Pacifics, LNER Encyclopedia
NRM archive image of 4469 heading for scrapping

4469
Sir Ralph Wedgewood
Railway locomotives introduced in 1938
Scrapped locomotives
Standard gauge steam locomotives of Great Britain